Transol Solutions Ghana, also known simply and stylized as TranSol, is a Ghanaian electronics company.
They are listed on the stock index of the Ghana Stock Exchange, the GSE All-Share Index. It formed on July 8, 2002.

Operations
Transactions Solutions Ghana, provides electronic funds transfer (EFT) infrastructure and support services, third party payments, teller machine services, prepaid voucher and top-up products.

References

External links
Transol Solutions Ghana official homepage
GhanaWeb.com
Transol Solutions Ghana at Bloomberg
Transol Solutions Ghana at Alacrastore
Transol Solutions Ghana at African Markets

Electronics companies of Ghana
Electronics companies established in 2002
Ghanaian companies established in 2002
Companies based in Accra
Companies listed on the Ghana Stock Exchange
Ghanaian brands